Antonio Bonini (born 15 July 1954) is an Italian volleyball player. He competed in the men's tournament at the 1980 Summer Olympics.

References

1954 births
Living people
Italian men's volleyball players
Olympic volleyball players of Italy
Volleyball players at the 1980 Summer Olympics
Sportspeople from Parma
20th-century Italian people